Beizhouzi Town is an urban town in Nan County, Yiyang, Hunan Province, People's Republic of China.

Administrative division
The town is divided into 14 villages and 2 community, the following areas: Hongfa Community, Yinhui Community, Xiangdong Village, Shunhe Village, Baili Village, Kewang Village, Changhu Village, Yongxing Village, Mapai Village, Donghong Village, Xiangyang Village, Minle Village, Longhe Village, Dawan Village, Zhongling Village, and Beisheng Village (宏发社区、银辉社区、向东村、顺河村、百利村、科旺村、长湖村、永兴村、马排村、东红村、向阳村、民乐村、龙河村、大湾村、中岭村、北胜村).

References

Divisions of Nan County